Ivan Thanthiran is a 2017 Indian Tamil-language action thriller film written and directed by R. Kannan. The film features Gautham Karthik and Shraddha Srinath in the lead roles, while RJ Balaji and Super Subbarayan play supporting roles. S. Thaman composed the film's music, while Prasanna Kumar handled the cinematography and Selva RK did the editing. The film released on 30 June 2017 to positive reviews and eventually became a box office success.

Plot 
Two engineering college dropouts and best friends, Sakthi (Gautham Karthik) and Balaji (RJ Balaji) start a shop in Richie street to sell assembled electronic products. Sakthi, who understands the electronic functionalities well, reverse engineers the products and sells them in their shop. Sakthi has also developed a mobile phone which can be assembled by unique parts and thus be heavily custom modified. He meets a final-year engineering student named Asha (Shraddha Srinath), who buys a laptop from him and later claims that he cheated her. They quarrel and later get on and fall in love. She even gets Sakthi's project accepted in a national electronics firm, for mass production in near future. One day, they get a job to fix CCTV cameras in a wealthy man's house. While fixing the job, Sakthi learns that the house belongs to the central Education-HRD Minister Devaraj (Super Subbarayan). Despite properly fixing the CCTV cameras, they are not paid and are insulted.

Meanwhile, Devaraj orders to close several engineering colleges, citing that they do not have either facilities or the required staff power, and around 10 colleges are closed in Chennai. Within 10 days, he approves the colleges which pay him astronomical bribes. As a result, engineering colleges are forced to collect extra fees from the students to match up to Devaraj's bribe. The students from financially weak families are unable to pay last-minute fees as the year end semester is nearing. One such student of final-year commits suicide by touching the live wire on the electric train in front of Sakthi and others. Later, Sakthi realizes that the reason behind the suicide is the bribe paid to Devaraj.

Sakthi uses his technological skills to expose Devaraj's bribe racket through social media and with the help of Balaji and an ally, Gopi ("Kabali" Hari Krishnan), who received a standing ovation for his project in electronics but ends up working as a waiter in a restaurant due to the antics of the politicians and society. He designs an electronic surveillance bug in the guise of a housefly and sends it to the place where Devaraj stores his newfound bribe. Arul (Stunt Silva), Devaraj's brother-in-law, is captured on screen with the cash, and the video goes viral. Though Arul denies any involvement of Devaraj, the media outrage causes the Prime Minister to fire Devaraj from the minister post. Now, Devaraj has to prove himself innocent, so he kills Arul when he was about to reveal Sakthi's name to him. Later, Devaraj captures Sakthi and Asha and assaults Sakthi, but Sakthi tricks Devaraj into revealing the locations of all of his black money, which is recorded by hidden cameras in Asha's house. They engage in a fight where Sakthi kills Devaraj. Sakthi then transmits the footage to the CBI and is lauded for his efforts. He takes a small amount from the confiscated money as his CCTV charges and is reunited with Asha and Balaji.

Cast
 Gautham Karthik as Shakthi
 Shraddha Srinath as Asha
 RJ Balaji as Balaji
 Super Subbarayan as Minister Devaraj
 Stunt Silva as Guna, Devaraj's brother-in-law
 Bharath Reddy as Bharath, Devaraj's goon and nephew
 Hari Krishnan as Gopi
 Mayilsamy as Theatre Owner
 Tharshan as a reporter of Sun TV
 Madhan Bob
 Sri Vignesh
 Shyam Prasad
 Raandilya as a rowdy

Production
In August 2016, R. Kannan revealed that his next film would feature Gautham Karthik in the lead role and would be an "action-thriller" set in Chennai. The team initially considered Anupama Parameswaran to play the leading female role, but later opted for Shraddha Srinath, who would make her debut in Tamil films through the project. The film began production in mid-August 2016, after a launch ceremony was held. Kannan revealed that the team hoped to finish the film in a single schedule. Chennai-based model Archana Sree and comedian RJ Balaji joined the film's cast during September 2016. This film may be remade in Telugu.

Music
The music was composed by S. Thaman in his third collaboration with director Kannan after Vandhaan Vendraan and Settai.

Release and reception
The film was distributed by Creative entertainments and distributors in 244 theatres in Tamil Nadu and 323 theatres overall in India. The satellite rights of the film were sold to Zee Tamil.

Critical reception
Ivan Thanthiran received highly positive reviews from critics upon release, with calling it "the director's best in recent years" in their initial review round-up. Srinivasa Ramanujam of The Hindu wrote,  Ivan Thanthiran A fairly engaging thriller that revolves around the lives of engineering students. while also singling out Gautham Karthik, Shraddha Srinath and RJ Balaji's performance for praise. Jyothi Prabhakar of Times Of India wrote 'We can willingly suspend disbelief for two hours of sharp and spiffy entertainment now, can’t we? Go watch' TOI Rating for the movie Ivan Thanthiran is 3.5/5  Anupama Subramanian of Deccan chronicle wrote Ivan Thanthiran a classic in the making, but rarely does anyone set out to watch a new film having such standards in mind. Just go to the theatres and enjoy a nice mid-summer hiatus. DC rating for the movie Ivan Thanthiran is 3.0/5  Baradwaj Rangan of Film Companion wrote "The director, R. Kannan, has no idea how to stage a scene and push our buttons."

References

External links
 Ivan Thanthiran on IMDb

2017 films
2010s Tamil-language films
Indian action comedy films
Films scored by Thaman S
Films about corruption in India
Films directed by R. Kannan
2017 action comedy films